BMO Tower is the name for several buildings associated with Bank of Montreal, also known as BMO Financial Group, and its American subsidiary BMO Harris Bank.
BMO Tower (Chicago), office tower in Chicago, Illinois, United States
BMO Tower (Milwaukee), office tower in Milwaukee, Wisconsin, United States
BMO Tower (Phoenix), office tower in Phoenix, Arizona, United States